Schima wallichii is an evergreen tree belonging to the tea family Theaceae. It is also known as the needlewood tree.

Schima wallichii is native to a wide area of China and tropical Asia.

References

Theaceae
Flora of China
Flora of tropical Asia